Boula  is a town and sub-prefecture in the Kankan Prefecture in the Kankan Region of eastern Guinea, near the borders of Mali and Ivory Coast. As of 2014 it had a population of 15,763 people.

References

Sub-prefectures of the Kankan Region